The Silvan Reservoir is located in Silvan about  east of Melbourne, Victoria, Australia. The reservoir is operated by Melbourne Water.

Operations
Water for Silvan is transferred from Upper Yarra, O'Shannassy and Thomson (via Upper Yarra) reservoirs.

In turn, Silvan directly supplies water to many of Melbourne's eastern suburbs as well as other off-stream storage reservoirs, including Cardinia and Greenvale.

History
A severe drought in 1914 forced the government to search for a new water supply to handle Melbourne's ever-increasing needs. Construction took place between 1926 and 1931. It was officially opened on 7 July 1931.

In 1983, the wall started to show cracks and remedial works were undertaken. The picnic ground was added to the Silvan Reservoir Park at this time, which is now managed by Parks Victoria.

References

External links 
Melbourne Water website - Silvan Reservoir

Reservoirs in Victoria (Australia)
Melbourne Water catchment
Rivers of Greater Melbourne (region)
1931 establishments in Australia
Buildings and structures in the Shire of Yarra Ranges
Infrastructure completed in 1931